Theologo '67 was a Canadian documentary television miniseries which aired on CBC Television in 1968.

Premise
This series featured the work of a Toronto theological congress during mid-1967. Subjects of concern included Christian unity, conscience, contraception, poverty, war and involvement in the world. It was created as a special miniseries by the producers of CBC's Man Alive series.

Scheduling
This half-hour series was broadcast on Sundays at 5:00 p.m. as follows:

 28 July 1968 - debut episode
 4 August 1968 - Christian Unity
 11 August 1968 - Person and Conscience
 18 August 1968 - pre-empted for CPGA Golf
 25 August 1968 - Poverty, War, Birth Control - discussion with Elizabeth Anscombe (Oxford University), E. Dawne Jubb (gynecologist) and Lawrence Lynch (University of Toronto).

References

External links
 

CBC Television original programming
1968 Canadian television series debuts
1968 Canadian television series endings
1960s Canadian documentary television series
Canadian religious television series
Television shows set in Toronto